Sweet Dreams (also known as Golden Dreams) is a 1981 Italian comedy-drama film directed, written and starring Nanni Moretti.
It entered the 38th Venice International Film Festival, in which won the Special Jury Prize.

Plot  
Michele Apicella (Nanni Moretti) is a young filmmaker on a lecture tour, speaking to audiences after screenings of his films. An insistent audience member (Dario Cantarelli) who appears at all the different venues repeatedly tells Michele that his films lack social relevance, challenging him to ‘show this film to a labourer from Basilicata, a shepherd from Abruzzo or a housewife from Treviso’.

Having finished the lecture tour, Michele returns home to the house that he shares with his mother (Piera Degli Esposti) and begins working on a new project, a film called Freud’s Mother. The strain of making the film takes its toll on him, and he retreats into a dream world in which he works as a teacher at a school and falls in love with one of his students, Silvia (Laura Morante). The dream turns sour as Silvia announces that she is moving to Argentina and will be gone for two years. This separation from Silvia drives Michele to the brink, and upon her return he transforms into a werewolf and chases her out of a restaurant, shouting ‘I’m a monster and I love you!’

Cast 
Nanni Moretti: Michele Apicella 
 Nicola Di Pinto: Nicola
 Laura Morante: Silvia
 Remo Remotti: Freud
 Piera Degli Esposti: Michele's mother
 Alessandro Haber: Gaetano
 Gigio Morra: Gigio Cimino
 Giampiero Mughini:  TV presenter  
Miranda Campa: Freud's mother
 Vincenzo Salemme: cultural operator

See also
 List of Italian films of 1981

References

External links

1981 films
Films directed by Nanni Moretti
Venice Grand Jury Prize winners
Italian comedy-drama films
1981 comedy-drama films
1981 comedy films
1981 drama films
1980s Italian films